These are the songs that reached number one on the Top 50 Best Sellers chart in 1955 as published by Cash Box magazine.

See also
1955 in music
List of number-one singles of 1955 (U.S.)

References
https://web.archive.org/web/20071030043425/http://cashboxmagazine.com/archives/50s_files/1955.html

1955
1955 record charts
1955 in American music